The Goal of the Year is a competition for the best goal kicked in the Australian Football League (AFL) during that season.  It is run in conjunction with the Mark of the Year competition and is currently sponsored by Rebel Sport. The winner is awarded the Phil Manassa Medal. The concept of awards for the goal and mark of the year is thought to have been initiated in 1970, as an unofficial award given by the media to Alex Jesaulenko following his famous mark in that season's grand final. The official awards were first given in 2001. Eddie Betts has been awarded Goal of the Year on an unparalleled four occasions (2006, 2015, 2016 and 2019), the most of any player, and is the only player to win the award in consecutive seasons.

Selection process
Each week, three of the best goals of the round (including the finals) are selected as nominees. A panel of AFL selectors choose the winning goal of the round.

For the first time in 2006, the general public are able to vote for nominated marks via the AFL's website.  The results of the public voting are combined with the panel's votes.
Any one of the goals of the round is able to win the official Goal of the Year.

The overall winner is selected from the 25 weekly winners (22 rounds and the first three weeks of the finals) by the AFL All Australian selection committee; the public is not given a say in the final outcome. The winner receives the Phil Manassa Medal, a replica of the perpetual Toyota AFL Goal of the Year Trophy, use of a Toyota Aurion for twelve months, and $10,000 for their grassroots football club. The winner will be announced on Grand Final day.

Goal of the Year is generally awarded to a player who creates and scores a difficult goal in play; it has never been, and is unlikely to ever be, awarded to a goal kicked from a set shot. Historically, it has been the quality of the creation of the goal which determines the winner, rather than the difficulty of the shot itself. As such, simply kicking a goal from the boundary line will not guarantee a player Goal of the Year, but if they have roved the ball cleanly off a pack (like Jason Akermanis in 2002) or won the ball by stealing or smothering it from an opponent (like Peter Bosustow in 1981), then they will generally come into Goal of the Year calculations. Players are also often rewarded for orchestrating a long run down the field which ends with a big goal on the run: Daniel Kerr in 2003 and Michael McGuane in 1994 are memorable examples.

Many of the best goals in the VFL/AFL were featured in a VHS/DVD named Golden Goals.

Goal of the year

Official winners (2001–present)
Legend

Earlier winner (1976–2001)
Legend

AFL Women's winners (2017–)
Legend

References

External links
AFL Goal of the Year Competition
YouTube video of the Goals of the Year in 2005
YouTube video of the Goals of the Year in 2002
YouTube video of Robbie Ahmat's Goal of the Year in 2000
YouTube video of Mark Merends's Goal of the Year in 2001
YouTube video of Andrew Bews's Goal of the year in 1985 
YouTube video of Peter Bosustow's Goal of the Year in 1981

Australian Football League awards
Australian rules football awards